Noel Grealish (born 16 December 1965) is an Irish Independent politician who has been a Teachta Dála (TD) for the Galway West constituency since the 2002 general election.

Political career
He is from the Gaeltacht region of Carnmore, near Galway. He was formerly a Progressive Democrats TD.

Grealish first contested an election in 1999, when he was elected to Galway County Council to represent the Oranmore local electoral area, with 1,357 first preferences. He was first elected to Dáil Éireann at the 2002 general election, with 2,735 first preferences, succeeding long-serving TD Bobby Molloy.

He was re-elected at the 2007 general election, with 5,806 first preferences. As one of only two Progressive Democrat TDs elected in 2007, he was appointed as Chairman of the Progressive Democrats Parliamentary Party in June 2007. He was Deputy Leader of the Progressive Democrats from 25 May 2007 to 24 March 2009, succeeding Liz O'Donnell in the position. Towards the end of 2007, Grealish stated that he had discussions with a senior Fianna Fáil politician about the possibility of him joining Fianna Fáil, but made the decision to stay with the Progressive Democrats.

He assumed the leadership of the Progressive Democrats on 24 March 2009, following the decision of then-leader Ciarán Cannon to stand aside and join Fine Gael. Grealish served as interim and final leader of the party until 20 November 2009, at which point the party disbanded.

He sits as an Independent TD in Dáil Éireann, and was re-elected as an Independent deputy at the 2011, 2016 and 2020 general elections. He supported the Fianna Fáil-Green Party government in parliamentary votes from 2007 until 24 September 2010, when he announced that he was withdrawing his support for the government due to health cuts.

Anti-immigrant rhetoric
In September 2019, Grealish faced criticism and calls to resign after he made comments about asylum seekers, described by some commentators as racist, which described all African asylum seekers as "spongers." The Taoiseach Leo Varadkar, after being told during an interview what Grealish had said, remarked "If that’s what he said, he should withdraw those remarks and make a statement on it and clarify them". Fellow Independent TD Michael Collins defended Grealish in a radio interview, in which he claimed Ireland was "losing its culture" because of immigrants and suggested that Ireland should "look after our own people first and then when that issue is sorted, let's start looking at people from across the world". For this, both he and Grealish were criticised in Irish political circles, with Labour leader Brendan Howlin calling the pair "highly dangerous", while Irish President Michael D. Higgins, while not directly referencing them, publicly rejected their rhetoric, suggesting it was not factual that Immigrants were replacing people in Ireland, and that Immigrants accounted for a high percentage of Ireland's GDP.

Grealish courted further criticism on 12 November 2019, when he claimed in the Dáil that immigrants in Ireland were sending vast sums of money out of the country, and singled out Nigerian residents in Ireland, claiming they were sending €3.5 billion in funds back to relatives in Nigeria. Grealish went on to suggest this amount could have been generated by crime. Ruth Coppinger rose to her feet and called Grealish's remarks "Disgraceful racism". Responding to his question, Taoiseach Leo Varadkar called on Grealish to present "any evidence" that the funds were generated by crime, while also citing the long history of Irish emigrants sending money back to Ireland. The Central Statistics Office of Ireland debunked his reading of the statistics on 13 November 2019, correcting him by stating the amount being sent back was only €17 million. Furthermore, Finance Minister Paschal Donohoe called on Grealish to clarify why he focused specifically on Nigerians and to justify his presentation of his figures. Housing Minister Eoghan Murphy said he did not like what Grealish was insinuating and referred to his rhetoric as "disgusting and potentially dangerous".

Oireachtas Golf Society scandal
In August 2020, Grealish became one of the figures of the Oireachtas Golf Society scandal, when members of the Oireachtas Golf Society were accused of breaching the rules set down by the Irish government about gathering during the COVID-19 pandemic. Grealish served as Captain of Oireachtas Golf Society and the event took place under his leadership, with the invitation to the event bearing his personal signature and the signature of President of the Society Donie Cassidy. Following the details of the event becoming known to the public, Galway City Mayor Mike Cubbard and Galway County Council Chairperson James Charity called on Grealish to resign as a TD.

In February 2021 the Director of Public Prosecutions announced Grealish would be criminally prosecuted for his role in Golfgate. In May Grealish was issued a summons for a court date of 22 July. The case was adjourned until 28 October. On 3 February 2022, Grealish, Cassidy, and their co-defendants were acquitted of all charges. The Court concluded: “They were all responsible people who would not have gone to a dinner unless they felt comfortable and unless the organisers had not put in place all that was required to make it safe." Grealish said he was "delighted with the outcome".

References

 

1965 births
Living people
Independent TDs
Local councillors in County Galway
Members of the 29th Dáil
Members of the 30th Dáil
Members of the 31st Dáil
Members of the 32nd Dáil
Members of the 33rd Dáil
Politicians from County Galway
Progressive Democrats TDs